Calothamnus montanus is a plant in the myrtle family, Myrtaceae and is endemic to the south-west of Western Australia. It is an erect shrub with short, needle-shaped leaves and red flowers with four stamen bundles. (In 2014 Craven, Edwards and Cowley proposed that the species be renamed Melaleuca georgi.)

Description

The flowers have 4 sepals and 4 petals.

Taxonomy and naming
Calothamnus montanus was first formally described in 2010 by Alex George from a specimen found in the Stirling Range National Park. The specific epithet (montanus) is "from the Latin montanus (montane), in reference to the occurrence".

Distribution and habitat
Calothamnus montanus occurs in the Stirling Range National Park in the Esperance Plains biogeographic region where it grows in soil derived from metamorphic rocks.

Conservation
Calothamnus montanus is classified as "not threatened" by the Western Australian Government Department of Parks and Wildlife.

References

montanus
Myrtales of Australia
Plants described in 2010
Endemic flora of Western Australia